The South Africa A cricket team is a national cricket team representing South Africa.  It is the second-tier of international South African cricket, below the full South Africa national cricket team.  Matches played by South Africa A are not Test matches or One Day Internationals, instead receiving first-class and List A classification respectively. Zubayr Hamza is the current captain of the side.

History
South Africa A played their first match in January 1994, a five-day first-class contest against the touring England A cricket team.

South Africa A have played a number of series, both home and away against other national A teams, and competed against other first-class opposition.  Their first tour was to Zimbabwe in 1994–95, when they played three first-class matches and three one-day matches, including one match against Zimbabwe A.  They played their first Twenty20 in November 2009, facing an England XI as part of the English tour of South Africa.

Current squad

This is a list of players who have played at least 2 First-Class matches or 3 List A matches for South Africa A team since 2018.International cap players are marked in Bold.

Captains

See also
 South African Fezela XI

References

External links
 South Africa A at CricketArchive

South Africa in international cricket
National 'A' cricket teams
C